Leithiinae is a subfamily of dormice. It is named after the Leithia, an extinct genus of giant dormouse from the Pleistocene of Sicily.

Classification
Subfamily Leithiinae
Genus Chaetocauda
Chinese dormouse, Chaetocauda sichuanensis
Genus Dryomys
Woolly dormouse, Dryomys laniger
Balochistan forest dormouse, Dryomys niethammeri
Forest dormouse, Dryomys nitedula
Genus Eliomys, garden dormice
Asian garden dormouse, Eliomys melanurus
Maghreb garden dormouse, Eliomys munbyanus
Garden dormouse, Eliomys quercinus
Genus Hypnomys† (Balearic dormouse)
Hypnomys morphaeus†
Hypnomys mahonensis†
Genus Leithia†
Genus Muscardinus
Hazel dormouse, Muscardinus avellanarius
Genus Myomimus, mouse-tailed dormice
Masked mouse-tailed dormouse, Myomimus personatus
Roach's mouse-tailed dormouse, Myomimus roachi
Setzer's mouse-tailed dormouse, Myomimus setzeri
Genus Selevinia
Desert dormouse, Selevinia betpakdalaensis

References
Holden, M. E.. 2005. Family Gliridae. pp. 819–841 in Mammal Species of the World a Taxonomic and Geographic Reference. D. E. Wilson and D. M. Reeder eds. Johns Hopkins University Press, Baltimore.

Dormice
Mammal subfamilies
Taxa named by Richard Lydekker